The 2021 season was Hammarby Fotboll's 106th in existence, their 52st season in Allsvenskan and their 7th consecutive season in the league. They competed in Allsvenskan, Svenska Cupen and Conference League during the year. League play started in April, initially behind closed doors due to the coronavirus pandemic. Stefan Billborn made his fourth season as manager, but was sacked after eight rounds and replaced by Miloš Milojević.

Summary
On 30 May 2021, Hammarby IF won the 2020–21 Svenska Cupen, their first title in the main domestic cup, through a 5–4 win on penalties (0–0 after full-time) against BK Häcken in the final. 

On 11 June 2021, Hammarby decided to terminate manager Stefan Billborn's contract, with the club placed 8th in the 2021 Allsvenskan table after eight rounds. On 13 June, Miloš Milojević, most recently an assistant at Red Star Belgrade, was appointed new head coach.

The side reached the play-off round of the 2021–22 UEFA Europa Conference League, after eliminating Maribor (4–1 on aggregate) and FK Čukarički (6–4 on aggregate), where it was knocked out by Basel on penalties (4–4 on aggregate).

In Allsvenskan, Hammarby finished in 5th place after a stronger second half of the campaign.

Players

Squad information

Transfers

In

Out

Player statistics

Appearances and goals

|-
! colspan=12 style=background:#DCDCDC; text-align:center| Goalkeepers

|-
! colspan=12 style=background:#DCDCDC; text-align:center| Defenders

|-
! colspan=12 style=background:#DCDCDC; text-align:center| Midfielders

|-
! colspan=12 style=background:#DCDCDC; text-align:center| Forwards

|-
! colspan="18" style="background:#dcdcdc; text-align:center"| Players transferred/loaned out during the season

|-

Club

Coaching staff
{|
|valign="top"|

Other information

Pre-season and friendlies

Friendlies

Competitions

Allsvenskan

League table

Results summary

Results by round

Matches
Kickoff times are in (UTC+01) unless stated otherwise.

April

May

July

August

September

October

November

December

Svenska Cupen

2020–21
The tournament continued from the 2020 season.

Kickoff times are in UTC+1.

Group 3

Knockout stage

2021–22
The tournament continues into the 2022 season.

Qualification stage

UEFA Europa Conference League
Kickoff times are in UTC+1 unless stated otherwise.

2021–22

Qualifying phase and play-off round

Second qualifying round

Third qualifying round

Play-off round

Footnotes

References

Hammarby Fotboll seasons
Hammarby Fotboll